Max Houttuin  (born 20 April 1978) is a former professional footballer who played as a midfielder for SC Heerenveen. He played for Heerenveen in the 2000–01 UEFA Champions League and the Dutch Olympic team with Mark Van Bommel, Wilfred Bouma, Kevin Hofland and Arnold Bruggink. However, by 2005 following a succession of injuries Houttin had retired from football to re-train as a carer for people with a mental handicap.

References

Living people
1978 births
Dutch footballers
Association football midfielders
Eredivisie players
Eerste Divisie players
SC Heerenveen players
SC Veendam players